Rudelzhausen is a municipality  in the district of Freising in Bavaria in Germany.

Population Trend

References

Freising (district)